This article is an outline about the activity of cycling. For an outline about bicycles themselves, see outline of bicycles.

The following outline is provided as an overview of, as well as a topical guide to cycling:

Cycling, also called bicycling or biking, is the activity of using / riding bicycles, (at least partially) human-powered, wheeled vehicles (typically by foot pedalling), for purposes including transport, recreation, social interaction, exercise, sport, therapy, other purposes, or any combination thereof.

Persons engaged in cycling are called cyclists, bikers, or sometimes bicyclists.
They typically either dress for where they are going, or for the cycling, sometimes having another set of clothing with them, or arranged.

Apart from regular two-wheeled bicycles, cycling also includes riding unicycles, tricycles, quadricycles, and other similar human-powered wheeled vehicles (HPVs).

Some bicycles are sold with (electric) motors (e-bikes), or other motor assistance.

Cycling is practiced either solo on the vehicle, or with company, including passengers, riding in front, or sitting on the cycle's luggage carrier, or little children and/or pet animals in appropriate seats or such fixed to the bike, or occasionally actually riding with more than one person, cooperatively, on anything from a simple twin / tandem bicycle, to a multi-person party bike.

Cycling is most frequently practiced on-road, but also off-road, either mixed with other traffic, or on distinct cycle lanes, separate, segregated, cycle tracks, or for unattended young children, and in some countries also for adults, on the pedestrians' pavement.

What is cycling? 

Cycling can be described as all of the following:

 Exercise
 Recreation
 Sport
 Commuting
 Transportation

Cycling equipment 

 The first piece of equipment would, of course, be a bicycle (see Outline of bicycles) 
Some jurisdictions require these by law:
 Bicycle helmet
 Bicycle lighting
 Bicycle lock Used, but not always necessary:
 Bicycle tools
 Cycling clothing
 Cycling gloves
 Cycling jersey
 Cycling shoe
 Cycling shorts
 Time trial cycling equipment

Cycling law and safety 

 Bicycle helmet laws by country
 Bicycle law in California
 Bicycle Safety Camp
 Bicycle safety wing
 Bicycle theft
 CAN-BIKE
 Danish bicycle VIN-system
 Dooring ( door zone, door prize)
 Electric bicycle laws
 Hand signals
 "Rules of the Trail"
 Safety in numbers

Health impact 
 Erectile dysfunction and genital numbness
 Health benefits of cycling
 Ulnar tunnel syndrome

Types of cycling 

 Bicycle commuting
 Mountain biking
 Downhill mountain biking
 Mountain bike racing
 Road cycling
 Vehicular cycling
 Freestyle BMX
 BMX racing
 Bicycle touring
 Indoor cycling
 Underwater cycling
 Enduro (mountain biking)
 Mountain bike trials
 Dirt jumping
 Artistic cycling
 Utility cycling
 Track cycling

Cycling sport 

 Cycle sport
 List of men's road bicycle races
 List of women's road bicycle races
 Cycling team
 Cycling records
 Cycling sprinter

Bicycle racing 
 List of cycling races in Spain
 List of cycling teams in Spain

Doping in cycling 
 List of doping cases in cycling
 Lance Armstrong doping case
 History of Lance Armstrong doping allegations – historic background
 Floyd Landis doping case
 Operación Puerto doping case
 Operation Aderlass
 Doping at the Tour de France
 Festina affair, a doping scandal at the 1998 Tour
 Doping at the 1998 Tour de France – other doping cases in that Tour
 Doping at the 1999 Tour de France
 Doping at the 2007 Tour de France

Track cycling 

 Track cycling
 List of cycling tracks and velodromes
 List of Asian records in track cycling
 List of European records in track cycling
 List of Oceanian records in track cycling
 List of Olympic Games records in track cycling
 List of Panamerican records in track cycling
 List of Universiade records in track cycling
 List of World Championships records in track cycling
 List of world records in track cycling

Summer Olympics 
 List of Olympic medalists in cycling (men)
 Cycling at the Summer Olympics
 List of Olympic medalists in cycling (women)
 List of Olympic records in cycling
 List of Olympic venues in cycling

Cycling infrastructure

Cycling infrastructure

 Bicycle-friendly
 Bicycle parking
 Bicycle transportation planning and engineering
 Cycling demonstration towns
 Cycle track
 Dirt jump
 Greenway
 Rails with trails
 Pump track
 Segregated cycle facilities
 Shared lane marking
 Sustrans
 TTF (Technical Trail Feature)
 United States Numbered Bicycle Routes
 Velodrome

Bike paths and trails

 Bicycle boulevard
 Bike lane
 Bike path
 Bike route
 Bike singletrack
 Rail trail

 Bike paths and trails by country:
 Australia
 Bike paths in Melbourne
 Bike paths in Sydney
 Canada
 Beltline Trail (Toronto, Ontario)
 Capital Pathway (Ottawa, Ontario)
 Cataraqui Trail (Ontario)
 Cycloparc PPJ (Pontiac, Quebec)
 Iron Horse Trail, Ontario (Kitchener-Waterloo, Ontario)
 Parc Linéaire Le P'tit Train du Nord (Laurentians, Quebec)
 Riverfront Bike Trail, Windsor, Ontario
 Riverfront Trail, Greater Moncton (New Brunswick)
 Route Verte (Quebec)
 Tomifobia Nature Trail (Eastern Townships, Quebec)
 West Toronto Railpath (Toronto, Ontario)
 Denmark
 Bike routes in Denmark
 Europe:
 EuroVelo – European cycle route network
 United States († - indicates primarily for hiking):
 American Discovery Trail†
 Colorado Trail† (Colorado)
 Farlow Gap (North Carolina)
 Neuse River Trail (North Carolina)
 Massanutten Trail† (Virginia)
 Virginia Creeper Trail (Virginia)

Bicycle sharing systems 
Bicycle sharing system

 B-cycle
 Santander Cycle Hire - London 
 Bicing
 Bike rental
 Bike sharing
 BIXI Montréal
 Call a bike
 Community bicycle program
 Hubway
 Stockholm City Bikes
 Vélib'
 Vélo'v

Cycling by region 

  Cycling in Azerbaijan
  Cycling in Australia
  Cycling in New South Wales
 Cycling in Sydney
  Cycling in Victoria
 Cycling in Melbourne
  Cycling in Western Australia
 Cycling in Perth
  Cycling in Canada
  Cycling in Toronto
  Cycling in Denmark
 Cycling in Copenhagen
  Cycling in France
  Cycling in Paris
  Cycling in Germany
  Cycling in Berlin
  Cycling in Munich
  Cycling in Hong Kong
  Cycling in India
  Cycling in Japan
  Cycling in Malaysia
  Cycling in Kuala Lumpur
  Cycling in Malta
  Cycling in Romania
  Cycling in Bucharest
  Cycling in the Netherlands
  Cycling in Amsterdam
  Cycling in New Zealand
 Cycling in Auckland
  Cycling in North Korea
  Cycling in the Philippines
  Cycling in Spain
  Cycling in United Kingdom
  Cycling in Cardiff
  Cycling in Leeds
  Cycling in London
  Cycling in Manchester
  Cycling in United States
  Cycling in California
 Cycling in Los Angeles
 Cycling in San Francisco
 Cycling in San Jose, California
 Cycling in Georgia
  Cycling in Atlanta
  Cycling in Illinois
 Cycling in Chicago
  Cycling in Massachusetts
 Cycling in Boston
  Cycling in Michigan
 Cycling in Detroit
  Cycling in Minnesota
 Cycling in Atlanta
  Cycling in New York
 Cycling in New York City
 Cycling in Syracuse, New York
  Cycling in Oregon
 Cycling in Portland, Oregon

Cycling in the media 
 International Cycling Film Festival
 List of films about bicycles and cycling

Cycling movements 
Bike bus (Bike train) - Escorted group of cyclists in an urban environment for transportation safely, and often as student transport.
 Critical Mass – cycling event typically held on the last Friday of every month in over 300 cities around the world.

Cycling clubs and organisations

Cycling clubs 

 Bicycle infantry
 Bicycle Network
 British Cycling
 Cycling club
 Cycling Embassy of Denmark
 Cycling Time Trials
 Cyclists' Touring Club
 Danish Cycling Federation
 Danish Cyclists Federation
 Équipe Cycliste Cascades
 International Human Powered Vehicle Association
 International Mountain Bicycling Association
 London Cycling Campaign
 National Off-Road Bicycle Association (NORBA)
 Rails-to-Trails Conservancy
 Toronto Bicycling Network

Cycling organisations 
 Critical Mass – cycling event typically held on the last Friday of every month in over 300 cities around the world.
 San Jose Bike Party
 Warm Showers – a hospitality exchange service and organization for cycle travelers.

History of cycling 
 History of cycling
 History of cycling in Syracuse, New York

History of road cycling

 2004 in men's road cycling
 2004 in women's road cycling
 2005 in men's road cycling
 2005 in women's road cycling
 2006 in women's road cycling
 2007 in men's road cycling
 2007 in women's road cycling
 2008 in men's road cycling
 2007 in women's road cycling
 2009 in men's road cycling
 2009 in women's road cycling
 2010 in men's road cycling
 2010 in women's road cycling
 2011 in men's road cycling
 2011 in women's road cycling
 2012 in men's road cycling
 2012 in women's road cycling
 2013 in men's road cycling
 2013 in women's road cycling
 2014 in men's road cycling
 2014 in women's road cycling
 2015 in men's road cycling
 2015 in women's road cycling
 2016 in men's road cycling
 2016 in women's road cycling
 2017 in men's road cycling
 2017 in women's road cycling
 2018 in men's road cycling
 2018 in women's road cycling
 2019 in men's road cycling
 2019 in women's road cycling
 2020 in men's road cycling
 2020 in women's road cycling
 2021 in men's road cycling
 2021 in women's road cycling
 2022 in men's road cycling
 2022 in women's road cycling

History of cycling at the Summer Olympics 

 Cycling at the 1896 Summer Olympics
 Cycling at the 1896 Summer Olympics – Men's 100 kilometres
 Cycling at the 1896 Summer Olympics – Men's 10 kilometres
 Cycling at the 1896 Summer Olympics – Men's 12 hour race
 Cycling at the 1896 Summer Olympics – Men's road race
 Cycling at the 1896 Summer Olympics – Men's sprint
 Cycling at the 1896 Summer Olympics – Men's time trial
 Cycling at the 1900 Summer Olympics
 Cycling at the 1900 Summer Olympics – Men's 25 kilometres
 Cycling at the 1900 Summer Olympics – Men's sprint
 Cycling at the 1904 Summer Olympics
 Cycling at the 1904 Summer Olympics – 1/2 mile
 Cycling at the 1904 Summer Olympics – 1/3 mile
 Cycling at the 1904 Summer Olympics – 1/4 mile
 Cycling at the 1904 Summer Olympics – 1 mile
 Cycling at the 1904 Summer Olympics – 25 miles
 Cycling at the 1904 Summer Olympics – 2 miles
 Cycling at the 1904 Summer Olympics – 5 miles
 Cycling at the 1908 Summer Olympics
 Cycling at the 1908 Summer Olympics – Men's 100 kilometres
 Cycling at the 1908 Summer Olympics – Men's 20 kilometres
 Cycling at the 1908 Summer Olympics – Men's 5000 metres
 Cycling at the 1908 Summer Olympics – Men's 660 yards
 Cycling at the 1908 Summer Olympics – Men's sprint
 Cycling at the 1908 Summer Olympics – Men's tandem
 Cycling at the 1908 Summer Olympics – Men's team pursuit
 Cycling at the 1912 Summer Olympics
 Cycling at the 1912 Summer Olympics – Men's individual time trial
 Cycling at the 1912 Summer Olympics – Men's team time trial
 Cycling at the 1920 Summer Olympics
 Cycling at the 1920 Summer Olympics – Men's 50 kilometres
 Cycling at the 1920 Summer Olympics – Men's individual time trial
 Cycling at the 1920 Summer Olympics – Men's sprint
 Cycling at the 1920 Summer Olympics – Men's tandem
 Cycling at the 1920 Summer Olympics – Men's team pursuit
 Cycling at the 1920 Summer Olympics – Men's team time trial
 Cycling at the 1924 Summer Olympics
 Cycling at the 1924 Summer Olympics – Men's 50 kilometres
 Cycling at the 1924 Summer Olympics – Men's individual time trial
 Cycling at the 1924 Summer Olympics – Men's sprint
 Cycling at the 1924 Summer Olympics – Men's tandem
 Cycling at the 1924 Summer Olympics – Men's team pursuit
 Cycling at the 1924 Summer Olympics – Men's team time trial
 Cycling at the 1928 Summer Olympics
 Cycling at the 1928 Summer Olympics – Men's tandem
 Cycling at the 1932 Summer Olympics
 Cycling at the 1932 Summer Olympics – Men's 1000 m time trial
 Cycling at the 1932 Summer Olympics – Men's individual road race
 Cycling at the 1932 Summer Olympics – Men's sprint
 Cycling at the 1932 Summer Olympics – Men's tandem
 Cycling at the 1932 Summer Olympics – Men's team pursuit
 Cycling at the 1932 Summer Olympics – Men's team road race
 Cycling at the 1936 Summer Olympics
 Cycling at the 1948 Summer Olympics
 Cycling at the 1952 Summer Olympics
 Cycling at the 1952 Summer Olympics – Men's 1000 m time trial
 Cycling at the 1952 Summer Olympics – Men's individual road race
 Cycling at the 1952 Summer Olympics – Men's sprint
 Cycling at the 1952 Summer Olympics – Men's tandem
 Cycling at the 1952 Summer Olympics – Men's team pursuit
 Cycling at the 1952 Summer Olympics – Men's team road race
 Cycling at the 1956 Summer Olympics
 Cycling at the 1956 Summer Olympics – Men's 1000 m time trial
 Cycling at the 1956 Summer Olympics – Men's individual road race
 Cycling at the 1956 Summer Olympics – Men's sprint
 Cycling at the 1956 Summer Olympics – Men's tandem
 Cycling at the 1956 Summer Olympics – Men's team pursuit
 Cycling at the 1956 Summer Olympics – Men's team road race
 Cycling at the 1960 Summer Olympics
 Cycling at the 1964 Summer Olympics
 Cycling at the 1964 Summer Olympics – Men's 1000m time trial
 Cycling at the 1964 Summer Olympics – Men's individual pursuit
 Cycling at the 1964 Summer Olympics – Men's individual road race
 Cycling at the 1964 Summer Olympics – Men's sprint
 Cycling at the 1964 Summer Olympics – Men's tandem
 Cycling at the 1964 Summer Olympics – Men's team pursuit
 Cycling at the 1964 Summer Olympics – Men's team time trial
 Cycling at the 1968 Summer Olympics
 Cycling at the 1972 Summer Olympics
 Cycling at the 1972 Summer Olympics – Men's 1000m time trial
 Cycling at the 1972 Summer Olympics – Men's individual road race
 Cycling at the 1972 Summer Olympics – Men's tandem
 Cycling at the 1976 Summer Olympics
 Cycling at the 1976 Summer Olympics – Men's 1000m time trial
 Cycling at the 1976 Summer Olympics – Men's individual pursuit
 Cycling at the 1976 Summer Olympics – Men's individual road race
 Cycling at the 1976 Summer Olympics – Men's sprint
 Cycling at the 1976 Summer Olympics – Men's team pursuit
 Cycling at the 1980 Summer Olympics
 Cycling at the 1980 Summer Olympics – Men's individual road race
 Cycling at the 1984 Summer Olympics
 Cycling at the 1984 Summer Olympics – Men's individual road race
 Cycling at the 1984 Summer Olympics – Men's points race
 Cycling at the 1984 Summer Olympics – Women's individual road race
 Cycling at the 1984 Summer Paralympics
 Cycling at the 1988 Summer Olympics
 Cycling at the 1988 Summer Olympics – Men's individual road race
 Cycling at the 1988 Summer Olympics – Men's points race
 Cycling at the 1988 Summer Olympics – Women's road race
 Cycling at the 1992 Summer Olympics
 Cycling at the 1992 Summer Olympics – Men's individual pursuit
 Cycling at the 1992 Summer Olympics – Men's individual road race
 Cycling at the 1992 Summer Olympics – Men's points race
 Cycling at the 1992 Summer Olympics – Men's sprint
 Cycling at the 1992 Summer Olympics – Men's team pursuit
 Cycling at the 1992 Summer Olympics – Men's team time trial
 Cycling at the 1992 Summer Olympics – Men's track time trial
 Cycling at the 1992 Summer Olympics – Women's individual pursuit
 Cycling at the 1992 Summer Olympics – Women's road race
 Cycling at the 1992 Summer Olympics – Women's sprint
 Cycling at the 1996 Summer Olympics
 Cycling at the 1996 Summer Olympics – Men's cross-country
 Cycling at the 1996 Summer Olympics – Men's points race
 Cycling at the 1996 Summer Olympics – Men's individual road race
 Cycling at the 1996 Summer Olympics – Men's time trial
 Cycling at the 1996 Summer Olympics – Women's cross-country
 Cycling at the 1996 Summer Olympics – Women's road race
 Cycling at the 1996 Summer Olympics – Women's time trial
 Cycling at the 2000 Summer Olympics
 Cycling at the 2000 Summer Olympics – Men's keirin
 Cycling at the 2000 Summer Olympics – Men's Madison
 Cycling at the 2000 Summer Olympics – Men's cross-country
 Cycling at the 2000 Summer Olympics – Men's individual pursuit
 Cycling at the 2000 Summer Olympics – Men's points race
 Cycling at the 2000 Summer Olympics – Men's individual road race
 Cycling at the 2000 Summer Olympics – Men's road time trial
 Cycling at the 2000 Summer Olympics – Men's sprint
 Cycling at the 2000 Summer Olympics – Men's team pursuit
 Cycling at the 2000 Summer Olympics – Men's team sprint
 Cycling at the 2000 Summer Olympics – Men's track time trial
 Cycling at the 2000 Summer Olympics – Women's cross-country
 Cycling at the 2000 Summer Olympics – Women's individual pursuit
 Cycling at the 2000 Summer Olympics – Women's points race
 Cycling at the 2000 Summer Olympics – Women's individual road race
 Cycling at the 2000 Summer Olympics – Women's road time trial
 Cycling at the 2000 Summer Olympics – Women's sprint
 Cycling at the 2000 Summer Olympics – Women's track time trial
 Cycling at the 2004 Summer Olympics
 Cycling at the 2004 Summer Olympics – Men's keirin
 Cycling at the 2004 Summer Olympics – Men's Madison
 Cycling at the 2004 Summer Olympics – Men's cross-country
 Cycling at the 2004 Summer Olympics – Men's individual pursuit
 Cycling at the 2004 Summer Olympics – Men's points race
 Cycling at the 2004 Summer Olympics – Men's individual road race
 Cycling at the 2004 Summer Olympics – Men's road time trial
 Cycling at the 2004 Summer Olympics – Men's sprint
 Cycling at the 2004 Summer Olympics – Men's team pursuit
 Cycling at the 2004 Summer Olympics – Men's team sprint
 Cycling at the 2004 Summer Olympics – Men's track time trial
 Cycling at the 2004 Summer Olympics – Women's cross-country
 Cycling at the 2004 Summer Olympics – Women's individual pursuit
 Cycling at the 2004 Summer Olympics – Women's points race
 Cycling at the 2004 Summer Olympics – Women's individual road race
 Cycling at the 2004 Summer Olympics – Women's road time trial
 Cycling at the 2004 Summer Olympics – Women's sprint
 Cycling at the 2004 Summer Olympics – Women's track time trial
 Cycling at the 2008 Summer Olympics
 Cycling at the 2008 Summer Olympics – Men's BMX
 Cycling at the 2008 Summer Olympics – Men's keirin
 Cycling at the 2008 Summer Olympics – Men's Madison
 Cycling at the 2008 Summer Olympics – Men's cross-country
 Cycling at the 2008 Summer Olympics – Men's individual pursuit
 Cycling at the 2008 Summer Olympics – Men's points race
 Cycling at the 2008 Summer Olympics – Men's individual road race
 Cycling at the 2008 Summer Olympics – Men's road time trial
 Cycling at the 2008 Summer Olympics – Men's sprint
 Cycling at the 2008 Summer Olympics – Men's team pursuit
 Cycling at the 2008 Summer Olympics – Men's team sprint
 Cycling at the 2008 Summer Olympics – Qualification
 Cycling at the 2008 Summer Olympics – Women's BMX
 Cycling at the 2008 Summer Olympics – Women's cross-country
 Cycling at the 2008 Summer Olympics – Women's individual pursuit
 Cycling at the 2008 Summer Olympics – Women's points race
 Cycling at the 2008 Summer Olympics – Women's individual road race
 Cycling at the 2008 Summer Olympics – Women's road time trial
 Cycling at the 2008 Summer Olympics – Women's sprint
 Cycling at the 2012 Summer Olympics
 Cycling at the 2012 Summer Olympics – Men's individual road race
 Cycling at the 2012 Summer Olympics – Qualification
 Cycling at the 2012 Summer Olympics – Women's individual road race

History of cycling at the Pan American Games 

 Cycling at the 1951 Pan American Games
 Cycling at the 1955 Pan American Games
 Cycling at the 1959 Pan American Games
 Cycling at the 1963 Pan American Games
 Cycling at the 1967 Pan American Games
 Cycling at the 1971 Pan American Games
 Cycling at the 1975 Pan American Games
 Cycling at the 1979 Pan American Games
 Cycling at the 1983 Pan American Games
 Cycling at the 1987 Pan American Games
 Cycling at the 1991 Pan American Games
 Cycling at the 1995 Pan American Games
 Cycling at the 1999 Pan American Games
 Cycling at the 2003 Pan American Games
 Cycling at the 2003 Pan American Games – Mountain Bike
 Cycling at the 2003 Pan American Games – Road Time Trial
 Cycling at the 2003 Pan American Games – Women's Road Race
 Cycling at the 2007 Pan American Games
 Cycling at the 2011 Pan American Games
 Cycling at the 2011 Pan American Games – Men's BMX
 Cycling at the 2011 Pan American Games – Men's Keirin
 Cycling at the 2011 Pan American Games – Men's Omnium
 Cycling at the 2011 Pan American Games – Men's cross-country
 Cycling at the 2011 Pan American Games – Men's road race
 Cycling at the 2011 Pan American Games – Men's road time trial
 Cycling at the 2011 Pan American Games – Men's sprint
 Cycling at the 2011 Pan American Games – Men's team pursuit
 Cycling at the 2011 Pan American Games – Men's team sprint
 Cycling at the 2011 Pan American Games – Qualification
 Cycling at the 2011 Pan American Games – Women's BMX
 Cycling at the 2011 Pan American Games – Women's Keirin
 Cycling at the 2011 Pan American Games – Women's Omnium
 Cycling at the 2011 Pan American Games – Women's cross-country
 Cycling at the 2011 Pan American Games – Women's road race
 Cycling at the 2011 Pan American Games – Women's road time trial
 Cycling at the 2011 Pan American Games – Women's sprint
 Cycling at the 2011 Pan American Games – Women's team pursuit
 Cycling at the 2011 Pan American Games – Women's team sprint

Other 

 Cycling at the 1906 Intercalated Games
 Cycling at the 1951 Asian Games
 Cycling at the 1982 Commonwealth Games
 Cycling at the 1988 Summer Paralympics
 Cycling at the 2002 Asian Games
 Cycling at the 2002 Commonwealth Games
 Cycling at the 1992 Summer Paralympics
 Cycling at the 1996 Summer Paralympics
 Cycling at the 2000 Summer Paralympics
 Cycling at the 2004 Summer Paralympics
 Cycling at the 2005 Mediterranean Games
 Cycling at the 2005 Southeast Asian Games
 Cycling at the 2006 Asian Games
 Cycling at the 2006 Central American and Caribbean Games
 Cycling at the 2006 Commonwealth Games
 Cycling at the 2007 All-Africa Games
 Cycling at the 2007 Southeast Asian Games
 Cycling at the 2008 Summer Paralympics
 Cycling at the 2008 Summer Paralympics – Men's 1km time trial (B&VI 1–3)
 Cycling at the 2008 Summer Paralympics – Men's 1km time trial (LC 3–4)
 Cycling at the 2008 Summer Paralympics – Men's individual pursuit
 Cycling at the 2008 Summer Paralympics – Men's individual pursuit (B&VI 1–3)
 Cycling at the 2008 Summer Paralympics – Men's individual pursuit (CP 3)
 Cycling at the 2008 Summer Paralympics – Men's individual pursuit (CP 4)
 Cycling at the 2008 Summer Paralympics – Men's time trial
 Cycling at the 2008 Summer Paralympics – Women's 1km time trial (B&VI 1–3)
 Cycling at the 2008 Summer Paralympics – Women's time trial
 Cycling at the 2009 Southeast Asian Games
 Cycling at the 2010 Asian Games
 Cycling at the 2010 Central American and Caribbean Games
 Cycling at the 2010 Commonwealth Games
 Cycling at the 2010 Commonwealth Games – Men's 1 km time trial
 Cycling at the 2010 Commonwealth Games – Men's Keirin
 Cycling at the 2010 Commonwealth Games – Men's Scratch
 Cycling at the 2010 Commonwealth Games – Men's individual pursuit
 Cycling at the 2010 Commonwealth Games – Men's points race
 Cycling at the 2010 Commonwealth Games – Men's road race
 Cycling at the 2010 Commonwealth Games – Men's road time trial
 Cycling at the 2010 Commonwealth Games – Men's sprint
 Cycling at the 2010 Commonwealth Games – Men's team pursuit
 Cycling at the 2010 Commonwealth Games – Men's team sprint
 Cycling at the 2010 Commonwealth Games – Women's 500 m time trial
 Cycling at the 2010 Commonwealth Games – Women's Scratch
 Cycling at the 2010 Commonwealth Games – Women's individual pursuit
 Cycling at the 2010 Commonwealth Games – Women's points race
 Cycling at the 2010 Commonwealth Games – Women's road race
 Cycling at the 2010 Commonwealth Games – Women's road time trial
 Cycling at the 2010 Commonwealth Games – Women's sprint
 Cycling at the 2010 Commonwealth Games – Women's team sprint
 Cycling at the 2010 South American Games
 Cycling at the 2010 South American Games – Men's 1 kilometre time trial
 Cycling at the 2010 South American Games – Men's BMX 20 inches wheel
 Cycling at the 2010 South American Games – Men's BMX 24 inches wheel
 Cycling at the 2010 South American Games – Men's Keirin
 Cycling at the 2010 South American Games – Men's Madison
 Cycling at the 2010 South American Games – Men's Omnium
 Cycling at the 2010 South American Games – Men's cross-country
 Cycling at the 2010 South American Games – Men's individual pursuit
 Cycling at the 2010 South American Games – Men's points race
 Cycling at the 2010 South American Games – Men's road race
 Cycling at the 2010 South American Games – Men's road time trial
 Cycling at the 2010 South American Games – Men's scratch race
 Cycling at the 2010 South American Games – Men's sprint
 Cycling at the 2010 South American Games – Men's team pursuit
 Cycling at the 2010 South American Games – Men's team sprint
 Cycling at the 2010 South American Games – Women's 500 metres time trial
 Cycling at the 2010 South American Games – Women's BMX 20 inches wheel
 Cycling at the 2010 South American Games – Women's BMX 24 inches wheel
 Cycling at the 2010 South American Games – Women's Keirin
 Cycling at the 2010 South American Games – Women's cross-country
 Cycling at the 2010 South American Games – Women's individual pursuit
 Cycling at the 2010 South American Games – Women's points race
 Cycling at the 2010 South American Games – Women's road race
 Cycling at the 2010 South American Games – Women's road time trial
 Cycling at the 2010 South American Games – Women's scratch race
 Cycling at the 2010 South American Games – Women's sprint
 Cycling at the 2010 South American Games – Women's team pursuit
 Cycling at the 2010 South American Games – Women's team sprint
 Cycling at the 2010 South Asian Games
 Cycling at the 2010 Summer Youth Olympics
 Cycling at the 2010 Summer Youth Olympics – Boys' BMX
 Cycling at the 2010 Summer Youth Olympics – Boys' cross country
 Cycling at the 2010 Summer Youth Olympics – Boys' road race
 Cycling at the 2010 Summer Youth Olympics – Boys' time trial
 Cycling at the 2010 Summer Youth Olympics – Combined mixed team
 Cycling at the 2010 Summer Youth Olympics – Girls' BMX
 Cycling at the 2010 Summer Youth Olympics – Girls' cross country
 Cycling at the 2010 Summer Youth Olympics – Girls' time trial
 Cycling at the 2011 All-Africa Games
 Cycling at the 2011 Commonwealth Youth Games
 Cycling at the 2011 European Youth Summer Olympic Festival
 Cycling at the 2011 Games of the Small States of Europe
 Cycling at the 2011 Island Games
 Cycling at the 2011 Pan Arab Games
 Cycling at the 2011 Parapan American Games
 Cycling at the 2011 Southeast Asian Games
 Cycling at the 2011 Summer Universiade
 Cycling at the 2011 Summer Universiade – Men's road race
 Cycling at the 2011 Summer Universiade – Women's road race
 Cycling at the All-Africa Games
 Cycling at the Asian Games
 Cycling at the Commonwealth Games
 Cycling at the Friendship Games

Notable cyclists 

 List of cyclists

 Jacques Anquetil
 Lance Armstrong
 Federico Bahamontes
 Gino Bartali
 Louison Bobet
 Ottavio Bottecchia
 Lucien Buysse
 Alberto Contador
 Fausto Coppi
 Henri Cornet
 Maurice De Waele
 Odile Defraye
 Pedro Delgado
 Cadel Evans
 François Faber
 Laurent Fignon
 Nicolas Frantz
 Chris Froome
 Maurice Garin
 Gustave Garrigou
 Charly Gaul
 Felice Gimondi
 Bernard Hinault
 Miguel Indurain
 Jan Janssen
 Hugo Koblet
 Ferdinand Kübler
 Firmin Lambot
 Roger Lapébie
 Octave Lapize
 André Leducq
 Greg LeMond
 Romain Maes
 Antonin Magne
 Eddy Merckx
 Gastone Nencini
 Manfred Nepp
 Vincenzo Nibali
 Luis Ocaña
 Marco Pantani
 Henri Pélissier
 Óscar Pereiro
 Lucien Petit-Breton
 Roger Pingeon
 René Pottier
 Bjarne Riis
 Jean Robic
 Stephen Roche
 Carlos Sastre
 Andy Schleck
 Léon Scieur
 Georges Speicher
 Major Taylor
 Bernard Thévenet
 Philippe Thys
 Louis Trousselier
 Jan Ullrich
 Lucien Van Impe
 Roger Walkowiak
 Bradley Wiggins
 Joop Zoetemelk

See also 

 Alleycat race
 Bicycle and motorcycle dynamics
 Bicycle and motorcycle geometry
 Bicycle culture
 Bicycle gearing
 Bicycle messenger
 Bicycle performance
 Bicycle racing
 Road bicycle racing
 Bicycle touring
 Cadence (cycling)
 Critical Mass
 Cyclability
 Cycle sport
 Cycling advocacy
 Cycling advocacy (aka Cycling activism)
 Cycling at the Summer Olympics
 Cycling at the Summer Paralympics
 Cycling demonstration towns
 Cycling domestique
 Cycling domestique
 Cycling power meter
 Cycling records
 Effective Cycling
 Eurobike
 Freeride mountain-biking movies
 Glossary of cycling
 Hillclimbing
 History of cycling
 History of the bicycle
 HPV Racing, Victoria Australia
 Human-powered transport
 Icetrack cycling
 Indoor cycling
 John Forester, engineer and bicycle transportation advocate
 List of Antarctic cycling expeditions
 List of bicycle and human powered vehicle museums
 List of bicycle manufacturers
 List of bicycle part manufacturers
 List of bicycle parts
 List of bicycle sharing systems
 List of bicycle types
 List of cycleways
 List of cycling tracks and velodromes
 List of doping cases in cycling
 List of electric bicycle brands and manufacturers
 List of films about bicycles and cycling
 List of important cycling events
 List of Japanese bicycle brands and manufacturers
 List of professional cyclists who died during a race
 List of rail trails
 List of songs about bicycles
 Mixed Terrain Cycle-Touring
 Modal share
 Mountain biking
 Downhill mountain biking
 Enduro (mountain biking)
 Mountain bike orienteering
 Mountain unicycling
 Outline of bicycles
 Outline of motorcycles and motorcycling
 Pacific Blue, a TV series about a team of bike police officers
 Para-cycling classification
 Randonneuring
 Road cycling
 Supermarket Street Sweep
 Tweed Run
 Ultra-distance cycling
 Underwater cycling
 Unicycle
 Utility cycling
 Vehicular cycling
 Velo Vision
 Six-day racing
 World Naked Bike Ride
 Clothing-optional bike ride

References

External links 

Cycling
Cycling